Complex algebra may refer to:
 A complex algebra (set theory), also known as field of sets
 Algebra over the complex numbers
 Algebra involving complex numbers